Revolution Brewing was a microbrewery in Paonia, Colorado.

Revolution Brewing was founded in 2008 by Mike and Gretchen King and was owned by local community members. Originally the brewery used a 3/4-barrel brewing system.  Later it used a six-barrel system.  Some of the beer was sold in a tasting room down the street from the brewery, some was available on tap at local restaurants, and some was distributed in cans.  The beer was not filtered or pasteurized.  It was made with water from nearby Mount Lamborn.  In 2018 the brewery was bought out by the Paonia United Brewing Company.

Beers
Revolution Brewing made a number of different beers.
Year-round
Miner's Gold golden ale
Colorado Red Ale
Stout Ol' Friend
SEIPA
Scottish
Seasonal
Pumpkin Ale
Lavender IPA
Cherry IPA
The "20 Can" Summer Ale
Light Lager
Octoberfest

See also

 List of microbreweries

References

External links
 

Beer brewing companies based in Colorado